Robert H. Perry is a U.S. yacht designer based in Seattle, Washington.  Among his designs are some of the most successful cruising yachts in modern cruising such as the Tatoosh 42, Tayana 37 and Valiant 40.
Through his career he has designed boats for many well recognized names in the yachting industry, such as Tayana, Cheoy Lee,
Valiant, Baba, Ta Shing, Islander, Passport and Saga.
Perry has taught yacht design at Evergreen State College.

Early life
In 1957 when Robert H. Perry was twelve, he and his family moved from Sydney, Australia to Vancouver, British Columbia.
He writes that the trip made a lasting impression on him and spurred his interest in yacht design.  At the beginning of his
ninth-grade year, his family moved to Mercer Island, Washington, an area renowned for its school system.  Here, his
interest in sailboats really clicked.  He met famous designer William Garden, joined the local yacht club, and
excelled at mechanical drawing.  Perry graduated with a 1.69 GPA from Mercer Island High School in 1964.  The only local college
that would accept him (and on a probationary status) was Seattle University.
He enrolled as a mechanical engineering student, but dropped out after four years.
Although the Vietnam War was growing and called him for enlistment,
his childhood history of petit mal seizures made him ineligible.

Career

In 1970, Jay Benford gave Perry his first job as a yacht designer.  Benford was promoting ferro-cement boats in Seattle. Soon, Perry had his first published design, a 47-foot ketch in National Fisherman.  Boatbuilder John Edwards who would found Hans Christian Yachts sent a letter to Perry in response to the 47-foot ketch.  Eventually, this relationship would lead to Perry's first design, the CT 54, a clipper-bowed ketch. Ted Brewer consulted and helped Perry with the design. Ta Chaio Brothers, a Taiwanese yard built the CT 54 and the larger CT 65.

Simultaneously, Perry was working on what would be his landmark design, the Valiant 40.  Along with Nathan Rothman and Sylvia and Stanley Dabney, he would design the first "performance cruiser."  They all met at Benford's ferro-cement studio, but even as Perry moved to work for Dick Carter they continued to strategize about building a bluewater cruising boat like the Westsail 32 that would have better performance.
Rothman contacted Uniflite, a Bellingham, Washington boat builder, and by 1974 the first Valiant rolled off their line.  The design combined the classic canoe stern cruiser shape with a fin keel and skeg hung rudder instead of the traditional full keel.

These two starts led to more design commissions for Islander Yachts and Tayana Yachts.  Perry became a popular designer for Taiwan-built boats.

Recent
Perry designed the latest (and largest) yacht for Pacific Seacraft, the SouthSea 61, beginning work in 2007.

Perry also designed a unique long narrow 62 foot double ended daysailer built at the Northwest School of Wooden Boatbuilding in Port Hadlock, Washington, and launched in March, 2014. This design was inspired by a number of famous classic vessels including vessels designed by L. Francis Herreshoff, Bruce King and Bill Garden. Perry was selected to create the design due to his past very successful double ended designs and the recent success of a number of his designs on the race course.

Awards

1979, Yacht Racing/Cruising Magazine, Medal of Achievement for Performance Cruising Design
1989, Cruising World Magazine, Cruising Hall of Fame
1995, American Boatbuilders Hall of Fame, Valiant 40 inducted into Hall of Fame

Boat designs

References

External links
Robert Perry homepage

American yacht designers
Seattle University alumni
Place of birth missing (living people)
Year of birth missing (living people)
Living people
People from Seattle
People from Mercer Island, Washington